Cefbuperazone (INN) is a second-generation cephalosporin antibiotic.

References 

Cephalosporin antibiotics
Tetrazoles
Piperazines